Oleg Nikolayevich Soskovets (born May 11, 1949) is a Soviet, Kazakh and Russian politician.

Soskovets was amongst those accompanying Boris Yeltsin during the 1994 diplomatic incident at Shannon Airport. 

He was originally the head of Boris Yeltsin's 1996 reelection campaign, devising its original strategy, but the strategy was ultimately abandoned and Soskovets was dismissed from his role as campaign chairman.

Soskovets was regarded as the "official protector" of the Trans-World Group which controlled Russian aluminium industry.

Soskovets was dismissed from Yeltsin's administration soon after the Xerox Affair.

Soskovets is the father-in-law of Dmytro Salamatin who was Minister of Defense of Ukraine in 2012.

Career 
1971-1973 – Roller Rolling Shop No. 2
1973-1976 – Master, Head of the department of rolling of sheet-rolling shop No. 2
1976-1981 – Deputy Head, Head of Rolling Shop No. 2
1981-1984 – Head of Rolling Shop No. 1
1984-1987 – Chief engineer of the plant
1987-1988 – Director of the Plant
1988-1991 – General Director of the plant
1989-1991 – People's deputy of the USSR from Temirtau Kazakhstan territorial constituency 
 April 10, 1991 – November 26, 1991 – Minister of Metallurgy of the USSR
 April 30, 1993 – June 20, 1996 – First Deputy Chairman of the Government of the Russian Federation
 Since 2011 – Vice-President of the Russian Academy of Engineering  and the president of the Russian Union of Manufacturers

References

External links
 Олег Сосковец на ll съезде партии «Наш дом — Россия» // РИА Новости

1949 births
Living people
Deputy heads of government of the Russian Federation
People from Taldykorgan
Government ministers of Kazakhstan
People's commissars and ministers of the Soviet Union
Communist Party of the Soviet Union members
Our Home – Russia politicians
20th-century Russian politicians
Deputy Prime Ministers of Kazakhstan
First Deputy Prime Ministers of Kazakhstan